A reverse crucifix may refer to:

A professional wrestling hold
The Cross of St. Peter